The 2020 Kansas City Royals season was the 52nd season for the franchise, and their 48th at Kauffman Stadium.  The 2020 season was the first under new owner John Sherman, whose purchase of the team was approved by the MLB on November 21, 2019. It was also the first season under manager Mike Matheny, replacing Ned Yost after having a ten-season tenure. The team finished with a 26–34 win–loss record, landing them fourth place in the American League Central.

On March 12, 2020, MLB announced that because of the ongoing COVID-19 pandemic, the start of the regular season would be delayed by at least two weeks in addition to the remainder of spring training being cancelled. Four days later, it was announced that the start of the season would be pushed back indefinitely due to the recommendation made by the CDC to restrict events of more than 50 people for eight weeks. On June 23, commissioner Rob Manfred unilaterally implemented a 60-game season. Players reported to training camps on July 1 in order to resume spring training and prepare for a July 24 Opening Day.

Offseason
 November 2, 2019: Alex Gordon (OF) elected free agency.
 November 5, 2019: Trevor Oaks (P) claimed off waivers by San Francisco.
 November 6, 2019: Jacob Barnes (P) released.
 November 20, 2019: Jorge Bonifacio (OF) (released 11/25), Nick Dini (C), Conner Greene (P), and Arnaldo Hernandez (P) designated for assignment.
 November 20, 2019: Foster Griffin (P), Carlos Hernandez (P), Nick Heath (OF), and Jeison Guzmán (SS) added to 40-man roster.
 December 2, 2019: Cheslor Cuthbert (1B/3B), Humberto Arteaga (INF), Jesse Hahn (P), and Erick Mejia (INF) elected free agency.
 December 12, 2019: Selected Stephen Woods from the Tampa Bay Rays in the Rule 5 draft.
 December 13, 2019: Signed free agent Jesse Hahn (P) to a major league contract.
 December 23, 2019: Traded Cristian Perez (INF) to the New York Yankees for Chance Adams (P).
 December 27, 2019: Finalized signing of free agent Maikel Franco.
 January 22, 2020: Signed free agent Alex Gordon (OF) and designated Heath Fillmyer (P) for assignment.
 March 25, 2020: Selected the contract of Trevor Rosenthal (P) and designated Eric Skoglund (P) for assignment.

Season standings

American League Central

American League Wild Card

Record against opponents

Game log

|- style="background:#fbb;"
| 1 || July 24 || @ Indians || 0–2 || Bieber (1–0) || Duffy (0–1) || Hand (1) || 0–1 || L1
|- style="background:#cfc;"
| 2 || July 25 || @ Indians || 3–2  || Barlow (1–0) || Karinchak (0–1) || Holland (1) || 1–1 || W1
|- style="background:#fbb;"
| 3 || July 26 || @ Indians || 2–9 || Carrasco (1–0) || Bolaños (0–1) || — || 1–2 || L1
|- style="background:#cfc;"
| 4 || July 27 || @ Tigers || 14–6 || Griffin (1–0) || Funkhouser (0–1) || — || 2–2 || W1
|- style="background:#fbb;"
| 5 || July 28 || @ Tigers || 3–4 || Alexander (1–0) || Zuber (0–1) || Jiménez (3) || 2–3 || L1
|- style="background:#fbb;"
| 6 || July 29 || @ Tigers || 4–5 || Garcia (1–0) || Kennedy (0–1) || Jiménez (4) || 2–4 || L2
|- style="background:#cfc;"
| 7 || July 30 || @ Tigers || 5–3 || Holland (1–0) || Cisnero (1–1) || Rosenthal (1) || 3–4 || W1
|- style="background:#fbb;"
| 8 || July 31 || White Sox || 2–3 || Keuchel (2–0) || Bubic (0–1) || Colomé (1) || 3–5 || L1
|-

|- style="background:#fbb;"
| 9 || August 1 || White Sox || 5–11 || Foster (1–0) || Bolaños (0–2) || Heuer (1) || 3–6 || L2
|- style="background:#fbb;"
| 10 || August 2 || White Sox || 2–9 || Cease (1–1) || Barlow (1–1) || — || 3–7 || L3
|- style="background:#fbb;"
| 11 || August 3 || @ Cubs || 0–2 || Mills (2–0) || Duffy (0–2) || Wick (2) || 3–8 || L4
|- style="background:#fbb;"
| 12 || August 4 || @ Cubs || 4–5 || Hendricks (2–1) || Singer (0–1) || Ryan (1) || 3–9 || L5
|- style="background:#fbb;"
| 13 || August 5 || Cubs || 1–6 || Darvish (2–1) || Bubic (0–2) || — || 3–10 || L6
|- style="background:#cfc;"
| 14 || August 6 || Cubs || 13–2 || Keller (1–0) || Chatwood (2–1) || — || 4–10 || W1 
|- style="background:#cfc;"
| 15 || August 7 || Twins || 3–2 || Holland (2–0) || Wisler (0–1) || Rosenthal (2) || 5–10 || W2
|- style="background:#cfc;"
| 16 || August 8 || Twins || 9–6 || Zuber (1–1) || Thorpe (0–1) || Rosenthal (3) || 6–10 || W3
|- style="background: #cfc;"
| 17 || August 9 || Twins || 4–2 || Singer (11) || Berríos (12) || Barlow (1) || 710 || W4 
|- style="background:#fbb;"
| 18 || August 11 || @ Reds || 5–6  || Sims (1–0) || Staumont (0–1) || — || 7–11 || L1
|- style="background:#cfc;"
| 19 || August 12 || @ Reds || 5–4 || Keller (2–0) || Miley (0–2) || Rosenthal (4) || 8–11 || W1
|- style="background:#bbb;"
| — || August 14 || @ Twins || colspan="7" | Postponed (inclement weather). Rescheduled to August 15.
|- style="background:#fbb;"
| 20 || August 15  || @ Twins || 2–4  || Duffey (1–0) || Speier (0–1) || Rogers (5) || 8–12 || L1
|- style="background:#cfc;"
| 21 || August 15  || @ Twins || 4–2  || Duffy (1–2) || Berríos (1–3) || Rosenthal (5) || 9–12 || W1
|- style="background:#fbb;"
| 22 || August 16 || @ Twins || 2–4 || Dobnak (4–1) || Singer (1–2) || Romo (3) || 9–13 || L1
|- style="background:#fbb;"
| 23 || August 17 || @ Twins || 1–4 || Smeltzer (2–0) || Bubic (0–3) || — || 9–14 || L2
|- style="background:#bbb;"
| — || August 18 || Reds || colspan="7" | Postponed (COVID-19). Rescheduled to August 19.
|- style="background:#cfc;"
| 24 || August 19  || Reds || 4–0  || Keller (3–0) || Castillo (0–3) || Rosenthal (6) || 10–14 || W1
|- style="background:#fbb;"
| 25 || August 19  || Reds || 0–5  || Bauer (3–0) || Harvey (0–1) || — || 10–15 || L1
|- style="background:#cfc;"
| 26 || August 21 || Twins || 7–2 || Duffy (2–2) || Odorizzi (0–1) || — || 11–15 || W1
|- style="background:#fbb;"
| 27 || August 22 || Twins || 2–7 || Dobnak (5–1) || Singer (1–3) || — || 11–16 || L1
|- style="background:#fbb;"
| 28 || August 23 || Twins || 4–5 || Clippard (1–0 || Bubic (0–4) || Rogers (6) || 11–17 || L2
|- style="background:#fbb;"
| 29 || August 24 || @ Cardinals || 3–9 || Flaherty (2–0) || Keller (3–1) || — || 11–18 || L3
|- style="background:#cfc;"
| 30 || August 25 || @ Cardinals || 5–4 || Staumont (1–1) || Gant (0–1) || Rosenthal (7) || 12–18 || W1
|- style="background:#fbb;"
| 31 || August 26 || @ Cardinals || 5–6 || Reyes (1–0) || Rosario (0–1) || — || 12–19 || L1
|- style="background:#fbb;"
| 32 || August 28 || @ White Sox || 5–6 || Colomé (1–0) || Kennedy (0–2) || — || 12–20 || L2
|- style="background:#cfc;"
| 33 || August 29 || @ White Sox || 9–6 || Newberry (1–0) || Burdi (0–1) || Hahn (1) || 13–20 || W1
|- style="background:#fbb;"
| 34 || August 30 || @ White Sox || 2–5  || Foster (3–0) || Zuber (1–2) || — || 13–21 || L1
|- style="background:#cfc;"
| 35 || August 31 || Indians || 2–1 || Barlow (2–1) || Karinchak (0–2) || Holland (2) || 14–21 || W1
|-

|- style="background:#fbb;"
| 36 || September 1 || Indians || 1–10 || Plesac (2–1) || Harvey (0–2) || — || 14–22 || L1
|- style="background:#fbb;"
| 37 || September 2 || Indians || 0–5 || McKenzie (2–0) || Junis (0–1) || — || 14–23 || L2
|- style="background:#fbb;"
| 38 || September 3 || White Sox || 6–11 || Cease (5–2) || Duffy (2–3) || — || 14–24 || L3
|- style="background:#fbb;"
| 39 || September 4 || White Sox || 4–7 || Heuer (2–0) || Singer (1–4) || Colomé (8) || 14–25 || L4
|- style="background:#fbb;"
| 40 || September 5 || White Sox || 3–5 || Giolito (4–2) || Bubic (0–5) || Colomé (9) || 14–26 || L5
|- style="background:#fbb;"
| 41 || September 6 || White Sox || 2–8 || Keuchel (6–2) || Harvey (0–3) || — || 14–27 || L6
|- style="background:#fbb;"
| 42 || September 7 || @ Indians || 2–5 || Plesac (3–1) || Keller (3–2) || Hand (12) || 14–28 || L7
|- style="background:#cfc;"
| 43 || September 8 || @ Indians || 8–5 || Holland (3–0) || Cimber (0–1) || Barlow (2) || 15–28 || W1
|- style="background:#cfc;"
| 44 || September 9 || @ Indians || 3–0 || Duffy (3–3) || Carrasco (2–4) || Holland (3) || 16–28 || W2
|- style="background:#cfc;"
| 45 || September 10 || @ Indians || 11–1 || Singer (2–4) || Civale (3–5) || — || 17–28 || W3
|- style="background:#cfc;"
| 46 || September 11 || Pirates || 4–3 || Bubic (1–5) || Brault (0–3) || Holland (4) || 18–28 || W4
|- style="background:#cfc;"
| 47 || September 12 || Pirates || 7–4 || Zimmer (1–0) || Williams (1–7) || Holland (5) || 19–28 || W5
|- style="background:#cfc;"
| 48 || September 13 || Pirates || 11–0 || Keller (4–2) || Kuhl (1–2) || — || 20–28 || W6
|- style="background:#fbb;"
| 49 || September 15 || @ Tigers || 0–6 || Boyd (2–6) || Junis (0–2) || — || 20–29 || L1
|- style="background:#cfc;"
| 50 || September 16 || @ Tigers || 4–0 || Singer (3–4) || Skubal (1–3) || — || 21–29 || W1
|- style="background:#fbb;"
| 51 || September 18 || @ Brewers || 5–9 || Rasmussen (1–0) || Duffy (3–4) || — || 21–30 || L1
|- style="background:#fbb;"
| 52 || September 19 || @ Brewers || 0–5 || Burnes (4–0) || Bubic (1–6) || — || 21–31 || L2
|- style="background:#fbb;
| 53 || September 20 || @ Brewers || 3–5 || Lindblom (2–3) || Keller (4–3) || Hader (10) || 21–32 || L3
|- style="background:#cfc;"
| 54 || September 21 || Cardinals || 4–1 || Staumont (2–1) || Wainwright (5–2) || Holland (6) || 22–32 || W1
|- style="background:#fbb;"
| 55 || September 22 || Cardinals || 0–5 || Gomber (1–1) || Singer (3–5) || — || 22–33 || L1
|- style="background:#cfc;"
| 56 || September 23 || Cardinals || 12–3 || Duffy (4–4) || Martínez (0–3) || — || 23–33 || W1
|- style="background:#cfc;"
| 57 || September 24 || Tigers || 8–7 || Hahn (1–0) || Alexander (2–3) || Newberry (1) || 24–33 || W2
|- style="background:#cfc;"
| 58 || September 25 || Tigers || 3–2 || Keller (5–3) || Turnbull (4–4) || Hahn (2) || 25–33 || W3
|- style="background:#fbb;"
| 59 || September 26 || Tigers || 3–4 || Boyd (3–7) || Hernández (0–1) || Garcia (4) || 25–34 || L1
|- style="background:#cfc;"
| 60 || September 27 || Tigers || 3–1 || Singer (4–5) || Skubal (1–4) || Hahn (3) || 26–34 || W1
|-

|- style="text-align:center;"
| Legend:       = Win       = Loss       = PostponementBold = Royals team member

Roster

Farm system

On June 30, 2020, Minor League Baseball announced that the 2020 season would not be played due to the COVID-19 pandemic.

References

External links
Kansas City Royals Official Site 
2020 Kansas City Royals at Baseball Reference

Kansas City Royals
Kansas City Royals seasons
Kansas City Royals